Ahmadiyeh (also Romanized as Aḩmadīyeh; also known as Ahmadī) is a village in Bahreman Rural District, Nuq District, Rafsanjan County, Kerman Province, Iran. At the 2006 census, its population was 901, in 222 families.

References 

Populated places in Rafsanjan County